Elbe is a census-designated place (CDP) in Pierce County, Washington, United States. The population was 29 at the 2010 census.

History
Elbe was known as Brown's Junction after the Tacoma & Eastern Railway was built in the region. When a post office was requested a shorter name was demanded. A meeting of settlers decided to honor the pioneer settler Henry C. Lutkens who had come from the valley of the Elbe in Germany.

In 1888 the first settlers came to the forests on the Nisqually River. Some of them were the German emigrants Karl Lütkens and Adam Sachs. Karl Lütkens, who was only 19 at the time, was so enthusiastic about his new home that he persuaded his parents Heinrich and Christina Lütkens to come to America as well. These left their previous home in Todendorf in the district  Stormarn in Schleswig-Holstein and arrived in America in 1891. The first settlers in this area also included Ferdinand Selle, Christian Fritz, Louis Schuffenhauer, Christian Kruse, Max Ogans, Hans Bartels, Fred Duke, W. Lawrence, Levi Engel, Vincent Rotter, R. Schmidt, Frank Salzer, Gus Stoll and Christian Weilandt. The small town grew, and on June 4, 1892, a post office was already established here.

During this time, the place that was previously called Brown’s Junction received its current name. It is no longer known exactly how the naming came about. Many of today's residents believe that Heinrich Lütkens suggested the name Elbe. However, everyone agrees that the name was chosen because the landscape of the Nisqually River at that time was reminiscent of the Elbe in the old homeland.

The economic development of the place in the following years was good. Nearby Mount Rainier was the destination of many tourists who took a break on their way to Elbe. In 1894 Heinrich Lütkens and his son Karl built a tourist hotel with 48 rooms. Ferdinand Selle had previously built a hotel, but it burned down after a short time. At that time, the village blacksmith Levi Engel was temporarily the editor of a newspaper called "Elbe Union". With his plate camera Levi Engel accompanied the village life for many years. In 1894 a town hall was also built, in which various events, including A. Dance events took place.

In 1895 Heinrich Lütkens and his family had a special reunion. From  Hamfelde in the district Herzogtum Lauenburg in Schleswig-Holstein was Carl Böttcher, the brother-in-law of Lütkens, emigrated with his family and settled in a neighboring town of Elbe.

In 1904, the town of Elbe was connected to the "Tacoma Eastern Railroad" rail network, after which the number of tourists increased rapidly. Another large hotel and several restaurants were built. The local co-founder Adam Sachs opened a department store during this time. Two years later, the villagers built a church. The building material and the plot of land were donated by Heinrich Lütkens. Until the opening of the church, the residents of Elbe had celebrated their services in private houses or in the town hall. In 1909 Elbe already had 250 inhabitants and in the course of the 20th century the population rose to 437.

Geography
Elbe is located at  (46.764924, -122.193117).

According to the United States Census Bureau, the CDP has a total area of 0.0 square miles (0.1 km2), all of it land.

Elbe is located approximately 76 kilometers south of Seattle and approximately 140 kilometers north of Portland, Oregon. Mount Rainier is about 34 kilometers northeast.

Climate
Elbe has a warm-summer Mediterranean climate (Köppen Csb) typical for the North Coast, characterized by warm (occasionally hot) dry summers, and mild to chilly, rainy and snowy winters. In Elbe's case the climate is moderated by the proximity to the Pacific Ocean with small temperature variations on average throughout the year, resulting in mild year-round temperatures, although winter can get cool with freezing and snow.
Elbe on average has very wet winters and summers with a few days of rainfall, also representative for the region. Temperatures of above  are common with measurable snowfall.

Demographics

The estimated population of Elbe is 54 as of 2018, almost double the 29 residents counted in the 2010 U.S. Census.

As of the census of 2000, there were 21 people, 10 households, and 7 families residing in the CDP. The population density was 818.2 people per square mile (270.3/km2). There were 10 housing units at an average density of 389.6/sq mi (128.7/km2). The racial makeup of the CDP was 100.00% White.

There were 10 households, out of which 30.0% had children under the age of 18 living with them, 40.0% were married couples living together, none had a female householder with no husband present, and 30.0% were non-families. 30.0% of all households were made up of individuals, and 30.0% had someone living alone who is 65 years of age or older. The average household size was 2.10 and the average family size was 2.57.

In the CDP, the population was spread out, with 28.6% under the age of 18, 23.8% from 25 to 44, 9.5% from 45 to 64, and 38.1% who were 65 years of age or older. The median age was 45 years. For every 100 females, there were 162.5 males. For every 100 females age 18 and over, there were 200.0 males.

The median income for a household in the CDP was $13,750, and the median income for a family was $0. Males had a median income of $0 versus $0 for females. The per capita income for the CDP was $13,863. None of the population or families were below the poverty line.

Local attractions

The Little White Church of Elbe 
The Elbe Evangelical Lutheran Church is a small church with the German inscription “Ev. Luth. KIRCHE”, which was built in 1906 by the inhabitants according to the plans of Reverend Karl Kilian. The church has since been restored and added to the National Register of Historic Places on October 8, 1976.

Church services take place once a month in the church from March to December.

Mt. Rainier Scenic Railroad 
A railway line that runs from Elbe to the settlement of Mineral and is operated with steam locomotives and historic cars. The route leads through forests, crosses the Nisqually River and ends at the Mt. Rainier Railroad and Logging Museum in Mineral.

Mt. Rainier National Park 
Mount Rainier National Park can be reached from Elbe via the National Park Highway after about 22 km.

Transportation
 Mountain Highway (State Route 7)
 State Route 706

The town has a rest area (no water), which cost over $3 million.

References

External links

 The Dispatch Newspaper:Serving Eatonville, Ashford, Elbe, Roy and Graham.
 Mt. Rainier Visitor's Center
 

German-American culture in Washington (state)
Census-designated places in Pierce County, Washington
Census-designated places in Washington (state)